The 2011 Catalunya GP3 Series round was the second round of the 2011 GP3 Series season. It was held on May 20–22, 2011 at Circuit de Catalunya, Montmeló, Spain, supporting the 2011 Spanish Grand Prix.

Classification

Race 1

Race 2

Standings after the round

Drivers' Championship standings

Teams' Championship standings

 Note: Only the top five positions are included for both sets of standings.

See also 
 2011 Spanish Grand Prix
 2011 Catalunya GP2 Series round

References

External links
GP3 Series official website: Results

Catalunya
Catalunya GP3